Lorea Agirre Dorronsoro (born 1968 Beasain, Guipúzcoa) is a Spanish journalist and anthropologist. She is editor in chief of Jakin.

Life 
She collaborated in the first publications of the local magazine Goierritarra and in "Arlote Irratia", the local radio station of Ordizia. 
While doing journalism studies, together with the team that was part of the magazine Argia, she prepared the supplement "A ze astelehenak" of the newspaper Egin. 
With some of these comrades of Argia magazine, she worked as a journalist for the new  Basque newspaper, Euskaldunon Egunkaria, later called Berria.

She is currently a researcher at the Sorguneak Research Center at the Faculty of Humanities and Educational Sciences (HUHEZI) at Mondragon University. 
She has done research on Basque, feminism and Basque culture. 
She has also been part of the Basque Council of Culture. 
She now works as a teacher in HUHEZI and since 2014 is the director of the magazine Jakin.

Works 
 Rosa Luxemburg (Elkar, 2000) , 
 Gazteei eta eta kulturari buruzko hausnarketa: Gipuzkoa 2001 (Gipuzkoako Foru Aldundia, 2001)
 Pilotaz egitasmoa (Kutxa Fundazioa, 2002)
 Joxemi Zumalabe. Ipurtargiaren itzal luzea (Euskaldunon Egunkaria, 2002) , 
 Gezurra ari du. Egunkariaren itxieraren kronika (Alberdania, 2004)
 Hedabideak : euskararen berreskuratzea III (Garabide Elkartea, 2010)
 Haurren aisialdi parte-hartzailea, euskalduna, hezitzailea eta herritarra garatzen (Txatxilipurdi Elkartea, 2015) , 
 Euskalgintza eta feminismoa : identitateak berreraiki, demokrazia sendotu, boteretze kolektiboa bultzatu eta subalternitate eraldatzaile unibertsalak eraikitzeko proposamen bat (Bat. Soziolinguistika aldizkaria, 2016).

References 

20th-century Spanish journalists
Spanish women journalists
1968 births
Living people
21st-century Spanish women writers
People from Beasain
Basque-language writers
Spanish women editors
Spanish editors
21st-century Spanish journalists
20th-century Spanish women